Kozica is a surname. Notable people with the surname include:

 Dženis Kozica (born 1993), Swedish footballer
 Kazimierz Kozica (1892–1969), Polish historian of cartography

See also
 Kozica (disambiguation)